Kimberly Jess (born 30 January 1992) is a former German high jumper and occasionally participated in long jump events in international level events. She was a junior World champion in the 2008 World Junior Championships in Athletics in Bydgoszcz, Poland.

References

1992 births
Living people
People from Rendsburg
German female high jumpers
Sportspeople from Schleswig-Holstein